USS Grayling (SSN-646), a  attack submarine, was the fifth ship of the United States Navy to be named for the grayling. Her keel was laid down in 1964, and she was launched just over three years later, and commissioned in 1969. She was involved in the submarine incident off Kola Peninsula on 20 March 1993, when she collided with the Russian Navy submarine . She was decommissioned in 1997, and disposed of a year later.

Construction and commissioning
The contract to build Grayling was awarded on 5 September 1962 and her keel was laid down at the Portsmouth Naval Shipyard at Kittery, Maine, on 12 May 1964. She was launched on 22 June 1967, sponsored by Miss Lori Brinker, the daughter of Lieutenant Commander Robert Brinker, who was commanding officer of the previous  when she was lost with all hands in September 1943 during World War II. Grayling (SSN-646) was commissioned on 11 October 1969.

Service history

Collision with Russian submarine, 1993

On 20 March 1993, Grayling collided with the Russian Navy submarine , a Delfin-class (NATO reporting name Delta IV-class) ballistic missile submarine north of Murmansk. Grayling had been tracking the Russian unit when the collision happened. The American submarine collided with the starboard bow of Novomoskovsk; neither submarine sustained serious damage.

1993–1997

Decommissioning and disposal
Grayling was deactivated on 1 March 1997, placed in commission in reserve a week later as she entered the Ship and Submarine Recycling Program, then decommissioned and stricken from the Naval Vessel Register on 18 July 1997. Her scrapping via the U.S. Navys Ship and Submarine Recycling Program at Puget Sound Naval Shipyard at Bremerton, Washington, was completed on 31 March 1998.

Commemoration
Graylings sail is now a memorial on the grounds of Portsmouth Naval Shipyard at Kittery, Maine, and her anchor and chain are on display as a memorial at The American Legion Post 106 in downtown Grayling, Michigan.

See also
Submarine incident off Kildin island

Notes

References

NavSource Online: Submarine Photo Archive Grayling (SSN-646)

 

Ships built in Kittery, Maine
Sturgeon-class submarines
Cold War submarines of the United States
Nuclear submarines of the United States Navy
1967 ships
Maritime incidents in 1993
United States submarine accidents